Franz Becker (1 March 1918 – 26 May 1965) was a German footballer. He played with 1. FC Köln for three years between 1951 and 1954 together with Hans Schäfer, Josef Röhrig and Fritz Herkenrath in the Western league.

In these years, he participated in 28 games, scoring one goal.

References

1918 births
1965 deaths
1. FC Köln players
Association football midfielders
German footballers